Nadia Tereszkiewicz (born 24 May 1996) is a French-Finnish actress.

Early life
Tereszkiewicz was born in Versailles to a Finnish mother and a Polish father, who named her after a character from the 1994 Nikita Mikhalkov film Burnt by the Sun. She practised dance from age 4 to 18, attending the École supérieure de danse de Cannes Rosella Hightower and then Canada's National Ballet School. She then took hypokhâgne-khâgne with an option in theatre, and a classe libre at the Cours Florent, in Paris. Tereszkiewicz speaks French, Finnish, English, and Italian.

Career
Tereszkiewicz danced in films and videos while studying. She made her feature film debut in The Dancer (2016), which inspired her to pursue an acting career.

In 2019, Tereszkiewicz appeared in Dominik Moll's Only the Animals, which earned her a Best Actress award at the Tokyo International Film Festival and inclusion in the list of revelations by the 2020 Césars. In 2020, she appeared in the French-Israeli miniseries Possessions in a leading role alongside Reda Kateb. In 2022, she starred in Forever Young, which premiered in competition at the Cannes Film Festival, directed by Valeria Bruni Tedeschi, who shared scenes with Tereszkiewicz in Only the Animals. In 2023, she was awarded the César Award for Most Promising Actress for her performance in Forever Young.

She received a Canadian Screen Award nomination for Best Supporting Performance in a Film at the 11th Canadian Screen Awards in 2023, for her performance as Amy in the film Babysitter.

Filmography

References

External links
 

1996 births
Living people
People from Versailles
French film actresses
French television actresses
21st-century French actresses
French people of Finnish descent
French people of Polish descent
Cours Florent alumni
Most Promising Actress Lumières Award winners
Most Promising Actress César Award winners